Kenneth Chisholm (March 17, 1829 – September 26, 1906) was an Ontario businessman and political figure. He represented Peel in the Legislative Assembly of Ontario as a Liberal member from 1873 to 1892.

He was born in Toronto Township (now part of Mississauga) in Upper Canada in 1829. He started work as a clerk and then as a grain salesman in Brampton. He went into business for himself in Milton but returned to Brampton and, with a partner, bought out his former employer. He served as postmaster from 1855 to 1873 and served several terms as reeve. He was elected to the Ontario legislature in an 1873 by-election held after John Coyne died. He was also a director of the Central Bank of Canada. He owned quarries in the Credit River valley which supplied stone used to build the Ontario Legislature in Toronto. In 1880, he invested in the local Haggert Foundry and became vice-president. However, by 1891, both the bank and the foundry had failed and Chisholm was forced to sell his mansion, now a Royal Canadian Legion hall in Brampton. He was appointed registrar for Peel County in 1892 and held that post until his death in Brampton in 1906.

External links

Biography at the Dictionary of Canadian Biography Online

1829 births
1906 deaths
Ontario Liberal Party MPPs